Irena Veisaitė (9 January 1928 – 11 December 2020) was a Lithuanian theatre scholar, intellectual and human rights activist. She was awarded the Goethe Medal in 2012 for her contribution to cultural exchange between Germany and Lithuania.

Life and career
Veisaitė was a Lithuanian Jew. She was born in Kaunas and survived the Holocaust. She earned a doctorate in Leningrad in 1963 with a dissertation on the poetry of Heinrich Heine, and was a lecturer at the teacher's college in Vilnius from 1953 to 1997. She was also head of the Thomas Mann Cultural Centre in Nida, Lithuania. .

She was the long-term President of the Open Society in Lithuania Foundation.

She was also known for addressing communism in her work, and said in an interview with Deutsche Welle that "the Soviets were very, very bad. Different from the Nazis, but not better."

Veisaite was married to Estonian director Grigori Kromanov until his death. She died from COVID-19 in Vilnius on 11 December 2020, during the COVID-19 pandemic in Lithuania, twenty nine days short from her 93rd birthday.

References 

1928 births
2020 deaths
Academic staff of the Lithuanian University of Educational Sciences
Lithuanian Jews
Lithuanian human rights activists
Holocaust survivors
Commanders Crosses of the Order of Merit of the Federal Republic of Germany
Writers from Kaunas
Women activists
Deaths from the COVID-19 pandemic in Lithuania